Marie-Louise Saboungi is a  Lebanese-born American condensed matter physicist at the Institut de Minéralogie, de Physique des Matériaux et de Cosmochimie (IMPMC), Sorbonne University, Paris, France.

Early life and education
Saboungi was born January 1, 1948, in Lebanon. She studied Mathematics and Physics at the Lebanese University in Beirut and obtained a Doctorat d’Etat in Physics at Aix-Marseille University, France in 1973, studying the statistical thermodynamics of molten salts.

Career

After her doctorate, Saboungi joined Argonne National Laboratory and worked there as Senior Scientist until 2002. Following this she was a director at the Centre de Recherche sur la Matière Divisée, CNRS until 2011. From 2007 to 2011 she was also Program Officer at Agence Nationale de la Recherche.

In 2011 she joined IMPMC at Sorbonne University, where she currently works.

She has also been a Distinguished Professor of Physics at University of Orléans in 2002–2011, and was appointed Distinguished Visiting Professor in Soochow University in 2014.

Research
Saboungi's work focuses on complex soft materials, including ionic liquids and aqueous electrolytes, with a view to applications in energy and biotechnology.  She also studies silver chalcogenides, which display many fascinating phenomena including fast-ion conduction at higher temperatures, linear magnetoresistance over a broad range of magnetic fields, and topological insulator behavior.

Awards and honours
 1990 – Fellow of the American Association for the Advancement of Science
 1991 – Award for Leadership in the Professions, YWCA of Metropolitan Chicago
 1992 – Fellow of the American Physical Society
 2000, 2014 – Fellow of Japan Society for the Promotion of Science
 2007 – Fellow, Alexander von Humboldt Foundation
 2014 – Doctor Honoris Causa, University of the Andes, Mérida, Venezuela

Selected publications
Large magnetoresistance in non-magnetic silver chalcogenides, Nature 390, 57–60 (1997), 
Electron distribution in water, J. Chem. Phys. 112, 9206 (2000), 
Improving reinforcement of natural rubber by networking of activated carbon nanotubes, Carbon, 46, 7, June 2008, 1037–1045, 
The Structure of Aqueous Guanidinium Chloride Solutions, J. Am. Chem. Soc. 2004, 126, 37, 11462–11470,

References

External links

List of patents

Living people
Condensed matter physicists
Women physicists
Fellows of the American Physical Society
Fellows of the American Association for the Advancement of Science
Aix-Marseille University alumni
Pierre and Marie Curie University people
1948 births